Jana Doleželová (born 23 June 1981 in Šternberk, Czechoslovakia) is a Czech actress, model, pharmacist and beauty pageant titleholder who won Miss Czech Republic as a 22-year-old and was a semi-finalist in Miss World 2004 in China.

References

External links

 Jana Doleželová's website

1981 births
Living people
People from Šternberk
Miss World 2004 delegates
Czech beauty pageant winners
Czech female models
Czech female dancers
Czech pharmacists
Czech film actresses
21st-century Czech actresses
Charles University alumni
Women pharmacists